In the folklore of Northumbria, the Sockburn Worm was a ferocious wyvern that laid waste to the village of Sockburn in Durham. It was said that the beast was finally slain by John Conyers. The tale is said by many to be the inspiration for Lewis Carroll's poem Jabberwocky which he wrote while in Croft-on-Tees and Whitburn.

Each newly consecrated Bishop-Prince of Durham, while entering the Bishopric for the first time at the local Ford or over the bridge over the River Tees at Croft-on-Tees, was presented with the falchion that John Conyers used on the worm. The Lord of Sockburn traditionally reads a speech while presenting the blade:

"My Lord Bishop. I hereby present you with the falchion wherewith the champion Conyers slew the worm, dragon or fiery flying serpent which destroyed man, woman and child; in memory of which the king then reigning gave him the manor of Sockburn, to hold by this tenure, that upon the first entrance of every bishop into the county the falchion should be presented."

The bishop would then take the falchion, and immediately return it, wishing the holder health and long enjoyment of the manor.

The tale of the worm may be inspired by the longships of marauding Vikings, who carved the heads of Worms (Ormr) on the bow, however this does not take into account the commonness of dragons in Germanic folklore including that of Northumbria (see the Laidly and Lambton Worms as well as the Worm of Linton).

The Sockburn Worm, with the falchion embedded in it, appears on the district badge of the local Darlington & District Scout Association.

References

External links
District badge of the Darlington & District Scout Association

Northumbrian folklore
County Durham folklore
Northumbrian folkloric beings
European dragons